A philtre is a potion, especially a love potion.

Philtre or Philter may also refer to:

Le philtre, an 1831 opera by Daniel Auber
Philtre, a 2005 album by Nitin Sawhney
"Philter (In viaggio attraverso l'Australia)", a song from The Fantastic Plastic Machine
Philter, stage name of Magnus Gangstad Jørgensen (born 1985), Norwegian electronic musician

See also 
Filter (disambiguation)